Clubiona comta is a species of sac spider (family Clubionidae) found in Europe, North Africa, Turkey and the Caucasus.

See also 
 List of Clubionidae species

References 

Clubionidae
Spiders of Africa
Spiders of Europe
Spiders of Asia
Spiders described in 1839